Jane Claire Allsop is an Australian actress, best known for her role as Jo Parrish on Blue Heelers.

Personal life
Allsop was born in the United Kingdom, and only a few months after her birth moved to the United States with her father, John Allsop and mother, Helen Allsop. When Allsop was two-and-a-half years old, her family settled in Mont Albert in Melbourne, Australia. She attended Strathcona Primary School and Melbourne Girls Grammar.

Jane Allsop is married to actor David Serafin, whom she met in acting class at age 13 but did not start dating until years later. Serafin had guest roles on Blue Heelers during Jane's time on the show in 2001 and 2003. In May 2006, Allsop had their first son, Indiana Zac Serafin, and in May 2008 had their second, Jagger Zed Serafin. They had twin girls in December 2016. The couple were married in July 2014.

Career
She began drama classes at age nine in Box Hill, and at thirteen she starred in the Wedgewood Pie commercial, where she wore a bright green bikini and was only on screen for a small segment.

Allsop began studying for an Arts Degree but dropped out. She was accepted into the Victoria College of the Arts in 1995 and studied for a visual and performing arts degree.

Whilst studying, Allsop guest starred on television series such as Neighbours (1995), Blue Heelers (1997) and Halifax f.p. (1998). After graduating in 1998, Allsop returned to Neighbours as a different character for several months.

In 1999 Allsop landed her break through role. She auditioned for Blue Heelers and won the lead role of Constable Jo Parrish. Over the next 5 years she would become one of Blue Heelers' all-time most popular characters, winning a Logie Award for the Most Popular New Female Talent in 2000, and receiving a nomination for a Silver Logie for Most Popular Actress in 2005. She played the role until 2004 when she left to pursue further career options. Her character was killed off in a bombing, this was used as part of a major revamp of the show.

After Blue Heelers, the next notable role for Allsop was a guest role in the ABC's MDA. Allsop played Lucy Morello, partner of Andrew Morello who have decided to use IVF to become pregnant. In 2005, Allsop appeared in the children's TV show Holly's Heroes for one episode as Abby Dawson. Also during 2005, Allsop guest starred on Last Man Standing.

In one of the first roles after the birth of her first son, Indiana, Allsop portrayed TV actress and comedian Noeline Brown in the 2007 tele-movie, The King: The Story of Graham Kennedy. During the same year, Allsop guest starred on Neighbours as Diana Murray, a barrister working with Toadfish Rebecchi (Ryan Moloney) and Rosetta Cammeniti (Natalie Saleeba) on a legal case. Allsop appeared in ten episodes.

Allsop has been cast in Matching Jack. Allsop plays a character named Marianne. The movie premiered at the 2010 Melbourne International Film Festival before going on wide release in August 2010.

Allsop also had recurring roles in Rush and Tangle from 2010. She appeared in Underbelly Files: Tell Them Lucifer was Here and The Slap in 2011. She had a supporting role in House Husbands and the mini series Devil's Dust in 2012. She joined House Husbands as a main cast member.

Allsop played Felicity in two seasons of the ABC series Rake. In 2018 she was in Underbelly Files: Chopper and True Stories with Hamish and Andy.

Filmography

References

External links

Living people
1975 births
20th-century Australian actresses
21st-century Australian actresses
Actresses from Melbourne
Actresses from Oxfordshire
Australian expatriates in the United Kingdom 
Australian expatriate actresses in the United States
Australian film actresses
Australian television actresses
Logie Award winners
People educated at Melbourne Girls Grammar
People from Oxford
Victorian College of the Arts alumni
20th-century English women
20th-century English people
21st-century English women
21st-century English people
People from Mont Albert, Victoria